Zerbolò is a comune (municipality) in the Province of Pavia in the Italian region Lombardy, located about 30 km southwest of Milan and about 11 km west of Pavia.  >

Zerbolò borders the following municipalities: Bereguardo, Borgo San Siro, Carbonara al Ticino, Garlasco, Gropello Cairoli, Torre d'Isola, Villanova d'Ardenghi.

References

Cities and towns in Lombardy